The Miss Nicaragua 2015 pageant, was held on March 7, 2015 in Managua, after several weeks of events.  At the conclusion of the final night of competition, Daniela Torres Bonilla from Managua won the title. She represented Nicaragua at Miss Universe 2015 later that year. The rest of the finalists would enter different pageants.

Placements

Special awards

 Miss Gillette Venus - Granada - Ruth Angélica Martínez
 Best Hair - Managua - Daniela Torres
 Most Beautiful Face - Tipitapa - Yaoska Ruiz
 Miss Photogenic - Managua - Daniela Torres
 Miss Congeniality - Matagalpa - Karen Salgado
 Best Smile - Managua - Daniela Torres
 Miss Fitness - Tipitapa - Yaoska Ruiz

Official Contestants

Trivia

 Celeste Castillo Miss International Nicaragua 2013 roaming around backstage and spoke to misses for their take on whether couture has any influence on their street style or double check their answers, to report on the action for the live broadcasting Show.
 Viewers were able to interact with the pageant via Movistar. Fans were able to vote for their favorite contestant through the Miss Nicaragua website, from February 7 to March 7. Miss Tipitapa, Yaoska Ruiz, won the most MSM votes among the contestants, winning her a spot in the Top 6.

Judges

 Mignone Vega - Fashion Designer
 Marianela Lacayo -  Miss Nicaragua 2002
 Claudia Salmeron -  Miss Nicaragua 2003
 Rafael Sanchez - Executive Director of AFN (American Nicaraguan Foundation)
 Vannesa Osorio - Marketing Manager of Contempo Hotel
 Tatiana Pilarte Arcia -  Independent Consultor
 Indiana Sánchez -  Miss Nicaragua 2009

Live Music
Opening Show – Ballet Macehuatl - "El Garañon"
Swimsuit Competition – Alias Rhythm - "Closer"
Evening Gown Competition – Mafia Funk & Polux - "Dias De Amar", "Fantasma Camaleon" & "Yo No Se Mañana"

Special Guests
 Grupo de Danzas S.e.v.E.n   - "Uptown Funk"

References

Miss Nicaragua
2015 in Nicaragua
2015 beauty pageants